The 1967 Ohio State Buckeyes baseball team represented the Ohio State University in the 1967 NCAA University Division baseball season. The head coach was Marty Karow, serving his 17th year.

The Buckeyes lost in the College World Series, defeated by the Houston Cougars.

Roster

Schedule 

! style="" | Regular Season
|- valign="top" 

|- align="center" bgcolor="#ccffcc"
| 1 || March 17 || at  || Reeder Field • Los Angeles, California || 4–3 || 1–0 || 0–0
|- align="center" bgcolor="#ffcccc"
| 2 || March 18 || at Cal State Los Angeles || Reeder Field • Los Angeles, California || 3–9 || 1–1 || 0–0
|- align="center" bgcolor="#bbbbbb"
| 3 || March 20 || at  || Unknown • Riverside, California || 5–5 || 1–1–1 || 0–0
|- align="center" bgcolor="#ccffcc"
| 4 || March 21 || vs  || Sawtelle Field • Los Angeles, California || 5–4 || 2–1–1 || 0–0
|- align="center" bgcolor="#ffcccc"
| 5 || March 22 || vs  || Sawtelle Field • Los Angeles, California || 11–14 || 2–2–1 || 0–0
|- align="center" bgcolor="#ffcccc"
| 6 || March 23 || vs  || Sawtelle Field • Los Angeles, California || 4–5 || 2–3–1 || 0–0
|- align="center" bgcolor="#ccffcc"
| 7 || March 24 || vs  || Sawtelle Field • Los Angeles, California || 4–1 || 3–3–1 || 0–0
|- align="center" bgcolor="#ffcccc"
| 8 || March 25 || at  || Sawtelle Field • Los Angeles, California || 3–4 || 3–4–1 || 0–0
|- align="center" bgcolor="#ffcccc"
| 9 || March 26 || vs  || Sawtelle Field • Los Angeles, California || 4–11 || 3–5–1 || 0–0
|- align="center" bgcolor="#ccffcc"
| 10 || March 31 ||  || Trautman Field • Columbus, Ohio || 18–0 || 4–5–1 || 0–0
|- align="center" bgcolor="#ccffcc"
| 11 || March 31 || Ohio Wesleyan || Trautman Field • Columbus, Ohio || 15–5 || 5–5–1 || 0–0
|-

|- align="center" bgcolor="#ffcccc"
| 12 || April 1 ||  || Trautman Field • Columbus, Ohio || 3–4 || 5–6–1 || 0–0
|- align="center" bgcolor="#ffcccc"
| 13 || April 1 || Kent State || Trautman Field • Columbus, Ohio || 0–2 || 5–7–1 || 0–0
|- align="center" bgcolor="#bbbbbb"
| 14 || April 7 ||  || Trautman Field • Columbus, Ohio || 2–2 || 5–7–2 || 0–0
|- align="center" bgcolor="#ccffcc"
| 15 || April 8 || Cincinnati || Trautman Field • Columbus, Ohio || 8–4 || 6–7–2 || 0–0
|- align="center" bgcolor="#ffcccc"
| 16 || April 8 || Cincinnati || Trautman Field • Columbus, Ohio || 0–2 || 6–8–2 || 0–0
|- align="center" bgcolor="#ccffcc"
| 17 || April 11 ||  || Trautman Field • Columbus, Ohio || 5–2 || 7–8–2 || 0–0
|- align="center" bgcolor="#ccffcc"
| 18 || April 14 ||  || Trautman Field • Columbus, Ohio || 10–9 || 8–8–2 || 1–0
|- align="center" bgcolor="#ccffcc"
| 19 || April 14 || Michigan State || Trautman Field • Columbus, Ohio || 3–2 || 9–8–2 || 2–0
|- align="center" bgcolor="#ccffcc"
| 20 || April 15 ||  || Trautman Field • Columbus, Ohio || 8–2 || 10–8–2 || 3–0
|- align="center" bgcolor="#ffcccc"
| 21 || April 15 || Michigan || Trautman Field • Columbus, Ohio || 1–5 || 10–9–2 || 3–1
|- align="center" bgcolor="#ffcccc"
| 22 || April 18 || at  || Hyames Field • Kalamazoo, Michigan || 2–3 || 10–10–2 || 3–1
|- align="center" bgcolor="#ffcccc"
| 23 || April 18 || at Western Michigan || Hyames Field • Kalamazoo, Michigan || 2–5 || 10–11–2 || 3–1
|- align="center" bgcolor="#ccffcc"
| 24 || April 21 ||  || Trautman Field • Columbus, Ohio || 3–0 || 11–11–2 || 3–1
|- align="center" bgcolor="#ffcccc"
| 25 || April 21 || Southern Illinois || Trautman Field • Columbus, Ohio || 2–3 || 11–12–2 || 3–1
|- align="center" bgcolor="#ffcccc"
| 26 || April 22 || Southern Illinois || Trautman Field • Columbus, Ohio || 5–7 || 11–13–2 || 3–1
|- align="center" bgcolor="#ccffcc"
| 27 || April 22 || Southern Illinois || Trautman Field • Columbus, Ohio || 12–0 || 12–13–2 || 3–1
|- align="center" bgcolor="#bbbbbb"
| 28 || April 25 || at  || Steller Field • Bowling Green, Ohio || 6–6 || 12–13–3 || 3–1
|- align="center" bgcolor="#ffcccc"
| 29 || April 28 || at  || Sembower Field • Bloomington, Indiana || 1–2 || 12–14–3 || 3–2
|- align="center" bgcolor="#ffcccc"
| 30 || April 29 || at Indiana || Sembower Field • Bloomington, Indiana || 0–5 || 12–15–3 || 3–3
|-

|- align="center" bgcolor="#ccffcc"
| 31 || May 5 || at  || Guy Lowman Field • Madison, Wisconsin || 4–1 || 13–15–3 || 4–3
|- align="center" bgcolor="#ffcccc"
| 32 || May 5 || at Wisconsin || Guy Lowman Field • Madison, Wisconsin || 2–3 || 13–16–3 || 4–4
|- align="center" bgcolor="#ccffcc"
| 33 || May 6 || at  || Wells Field • Evanston, Illinois || 5–0 || 14–16–3 || 5–4
|- align="center" bgcolor="#ccffcc"
| 34 || May 6 || at Northwestern || Wells Field • Evanston, Illinois || 1–0 || 15–16–3 || 6–4
|- align="center" bgcolor="#ccffcc"
| 35 || May 12 ||  || Trautman Field • Columbus, Ohio || 3–2 || 16–16–3 || 7–4
|- align="center" bgcolor="#ccffcc"
| 36 || May 12 || Illinois || Trautman Field • Columbus, Ohio || 6–2 || 17–16–3 || 8–4
|- align="center" bgcolor="#ccffcc"
| 37 || May 13 ||  || Trautman Field • Columbus, Ohio || 3–0 || 18–16–3 || 9–4
|- align="center" bgcolor="#ccffcc"
| 38 || May 13 || Purdue || Trautman Field • Columbus, Ohio || 7–1 || 19–16–3 || 10–4
|- align="center" bgcolor="#ffcccc"
| 39 || May 19 || at  || Delta Field • Minneapolis, Minnesota || 0–7 || 19–17–3 || 10–5
|- align="center" bgcolor="#ccffcc"
| 41 || May 19 || at Minnesota || Delta Field • Minneapolis, Minnesota || 12–9 || 20–17–3 || 11–5
|- align="center" bgcolor="#ccffcc"
| 42 || May 20 || at  || Unknown • Iowa City, Iowa || 2–1 || 21–17–3 || 12–5
|- align="center" bgcolor="#ccffcc"
| 43 || May 20 || at Iowa || Unknown • Iowa City, Iowa || 1–0 || 22–17–3 || 13–5
|-

|-
|-
! style="" | Postseason
|- valign="top"

|- align="center" bgcolor="#ccffcc"
| 44 || May 25 || vs  || Abe Martin Field • Carbondale, Illinois || 3–2 || 23–17–3 || 13–5
|- align="center" bgcolor="#ccffcc"
| 45 || May 26 || at Southern Illinois || Abe Martin Field • Carbondale, Illinois || 5–4 || 24–17–3 || 13–5
|- align="center" bgcolor="#ffcccc"
| 46 || May 27 || vs Western Michigan || Abe Martin Field • Carbondale, Illinois || 4–5 || 24–18–3 || 13–5
|- align="center" bgcolor="#ccffcc"
| 47 || May 27 || vs Western Michigan || Abe Martin Field • Carbondale, Illinois || 5–4 || 25–18–3 || 13–5
|-

|- align="center" bgcolor="#ffcccc"
| 48 || June 12 || vs  || Johnny Rosenblatt Stadium • Omaha, Nebraska || 0–1 || 25–19–3 || 13–5
|- align="center" bgcolor="#ffcccc"
| 49 || June 13 || Houston || Johnny Rosenblatt Stadium • Omaha, Nebraska || 6–7 || 25–20–3 || 13–5
|-

Awards and honors 
Joe Sadelfeld
 First Team All-Big Ten

Ray Shoup
 First Team All-Big Ten
 First Team All-American

References 

Ohio State Buckeyes baseball seasons
Ohio State Buckeyes baseball
Big Ten Conference baseball champion seasons
Ohio State
College World Series seasons